Shri Parthasarathi Rajagopalachari (24 July 1927 – 20 December 2014) better known as Chariji, was the third in the line of Raja Yoga Masters in the Sahaj Marg System of Spiritual Practice of Shri Ram Chandra Mission (SRCM).

Early life
Chariji was born in a South Indian family. The eldest of four children, his father Shri C. A. Rajagopalachari served in the Indian Railways and his mother, Srimathi R. Janaki, was an amateur violinist who died when Chariji was only five years old. He had two brothers Kothandraman and Srininvasan (Seena). He also had One Younger Sister named Vasantha.

Education 
Chariji Studied Bachelor's Degree in Science in Banaras Hindu University in Calcutta.
During his time , Dr.Sarvapalli Radhakrishnan was the Vice Chancellor of the University.
He also Joined in U.O.T.C (University Officers' Training Corps). He was Admitted into 1st
UP Battalion UOTC..ITF as a Cadet.

Family life
Chariji was married to Smt. Sulochana and he had one son named P.R. Krishna.
Krishna (Chariji's Son) was married to Smt. Priya and they had two Children named Bargav (Son) and Madhuri (Daughter).

Professional life
After graduating from Banaras Hindu University with a B.Sc., Chariji worked for Indian Plastics Ltd. and T.T. Krishnamachari & Co., retiring from employment in 1985 as a corporate executive director in the TTK Group

Sahaj Marg and spirituality
In 1964, Chariji met and became the disciple of Shri Ram Chandra of Shahjahanpur, also known as Babuji, who was the founder President of the Shri Ram Chandra Mission. As Babuji's health was deteriorating, he nominated Chariji as his successor, and after his death in 1983, Chariji became the President of the Shri Ram Chandra Mission and the third Raja Yoga Master of Sahaj Marg. He oversaw the growth and expansion of Sahaj Marg into more than 100 countries. He founded the Lalaji Memorial Omega International School in Chennai. He traveled extensively around the world giving talks and conducting seminars on Raja Yoga up until 2008.

Final years and death
Chariji's health deteriorated from July 2012 until he died on 20 December 2014. He was succeeded as president of the Shri Ram Chandra Mission by Kamlesh Patel, also known as Daaji.

References

Sources

 
 
 
 
 
 
 

1927 births
2014 deaths
Banaras Hindu University alumni
Indian spiritual teachers
Indian spiritual writers
People from Tamil Nadu